Manauli Fort is located in the Manauli village of Mohali district, Punjab, India. Manauli is a small village with a population of 3,919 and 693 households (2011 Census).

Gallery

References

External links
 http://www.tribuneindia.com/2001/20010331/windows/main3.htm

Sahibzada Ajit Singh Nagar district
Forts in Punjab, India